KSWN, carrying the on-air branding of 93.9 The Zone, is a Top 40 (CHR) radio station licensed to and serving the city of McCook, Nebraska and its surrounding area. Previously a Hot AC outlet, it changed formats on June 10, 2011.

References

External links
93.9 The Zone's Official Website

Contemporary hit radio stations in the United States
SWN